Women in Suriname are women who were born in, live in, or are from Suriname. Surinamese women may be ethnically East Indian, Creole/Afro-Surinamese, Javanese, Amerindian, Mixed, or of other ancestry. Many women of Suriname work in the informal sector and in subsistence agriculture.

Surinamese women have been described as the "emotional and economic center" of the household (see matrifocality), particularly in Creole family groups. However, in traditionally patriarchal East Indian family groups, they have been described to act as subordinates, expected to obey cultural norms, such as not to practice living together with a partner without being married first and that the bride should maintain her virginity until consummation after marriage.

In relation to caring for infants, Suriname's mothers place their babies inside cribs near them, particularly for sleeping, but they are separated into another room if already at the right age. Other child rearing practices of women in Suriname include mothers carrying their babies during the day until night time, when mothers place their babies in hammocks to sleep. Child care is different in Maroon women and Amerindian women, because they are "reluctant to let anybody touch their babies". In general, Surinamese women allow their children to spend the first five to six years with them.

There are Surinamese proverbs that describe women in Suriname. The saying "An old woman's soup tastes better than a young woman's breast" is an example of those proverbs.

Clothing
According to Country Reports, every ethnic groups of women in Suriname may differ in terms of clothing practices. Women of Suriname with Javanese heritage wear sarongs. The women with Creole ancestry or are Afro-Surinamese wear the koto that is accompanied by a handkerchief or with head or body covering called as the angisa (also known as the anisa.

Surinamese women 

Among the prominent women of Suriname are Elisabeth Samson, Cynthia McLeod, Marijke Djwalapersad, Jennifer Simons, and Ruth Wijdenbosch.

Cynthia McLeod (born as Cynthia Ferrier) is a Surinamese novelist, the half sister of Dutch politician Kathleen Ferrier (who is of Surinamese descent), who wrote about the life of Elisabeth Samson, a free black woman whose name occurs prominently in historical works on Suriname because she wanted to marry a white man (which was forbidden in the colony Suriname during the first half of the 18th century). According to McLeod, Samson was a rich free black person in Surinamese society that was dominated by prejudices and white supremacy. McLeod wrote the highly captivating novel titled The Free Negress Elisabeth, Prisoner of Color.

In Surinamese politics, Marijke Djwalapersad became the first woman in Suriname's history to assume as Chairperson of the National Assembly of Suriname (Surinamese Parliament) on October 10, 1996, holding the position until July 24, 2000. Then on June 30, 2010, Jennifer Simons (last name became Geerlings after marriage) became the second female chairman of the Surinamese National Assembly. Another Surinamese female politician, Ruth Wijdenbosch, became the first woman in Suriname to be appointed as vice-chair.

See also 
 List of Surinamese people
 Human trafficking in Suriname

References

External links

Today in Suriname History: Elisabeth Samson
Suriname's Miss Alida Pageant

 
Surinamese women
Women in South America